Alaska Central Railroad Tunnel No. 1, also known as the Loop District Tunnel No. 1 is a historic railroad tunnel located about  north of Seward, Alaska, in the Placer River Valley, Kenai Peninsula. The tunnel was dug in 1906 and served the Alaska Central Railroad and later the Alaska Railroad until the route in the area, known as the "Loop District" was rerouted in 1951.

History
In 1903, the Alaska Central Railroad began a rail project north from Seward. Between March and November 1905, engineer Frank Bartlett determined sites for the structures needed to complete the route. At Mile 48.2 the route traveled through the tunnel.

The tunnel was part of a section of the route that turned 235 degrees. The tunnel curved at 14 degrees per hundred feet and approximately 100 degrees of the turn was completed within the tunnel.

Construction began on January 16, 1906. The first  was dug using a steam-powered drill. Despite good progress made with the steam drill, the heat from the steam caused the tunnel to become too hot, and pneumatic power was used beginning April 28. Drilling was completed on September 25 on the tunnel finished on October 8. The total cost of labor and materials was US$96,782.66.

In 1914, a survey crew for the Alaska Engineering Commission studied the area for a proposed government railroad and to assess the Alaska Central line. The Commission recommended that the Alaska Central line be purchased by the state, and it was incorporated into the state's Alaska Railroad. The state extended the line north to Anchorage.

The Loop District and Tunnel #1 were difficult and expensive to maintain, especially during the winter season. During the winter, a crew of men were stationed at the tunnel to operate a steam heating plant and large doors that had been installed at either end of the tunnel to keep the tracks inside from freezing. With rising costs associated with keeping the tunnel operable and the task of replacing many declining trestles, the railroad undertook a $1 million project in 1951 to relocate the route around Loop District between Miles 47.5 and 50.8 north of Seward. The retreat of Bartlett Glacier made a new route possible. The completion of the new route and dedication on November 6, 1951, made the Loop District route obsolete.

The tunnel was added to the National Register of Historic Places on November 28, 1977, and is in the possession of the Chugach National Forest.

See also
National Register of Historic Places listings in Kenai Peninsula Borough, Alaska
List of bridges on the National Register of Historic Places in Alaska

References

Buildings and structures in Kenai Peninsula Borough, Alaska
Railway buildings and structures on the National Register of Historic Places in Alaska
Railroad tunnels in Alaska
Railway tunnels on the National Register of Historic Places
Tunnels completed in 1906
Transportation in Kenai Peninsula Borough, Alaska
Buildings and structures on the National Register of Historic Places in Kenai Peninsula Borough, Alaska
1906 establishments in Alaska